Vladimir Vladimirovich Nevinsky (born 14 September 1973) is a Belarusian professional football coach and a former player. He is currently the head coach of Gomel.

In 2018–2019 he was a head coach at Torpedo Minsk.

Career

Honours
BATE Borisov
Belarusian Premier League champion: 1999, 2002

References

External links 

Profile at BATE Borisov website

1973 births
Living people
Belarusian footballers
Association football midfielders
Belarusian expatriate footballers
Expatriate footballers in Israel
Expatriate footballers in Hungary
FC Dynamo Brest players
FC Torpedo Minsk players
FC Dnepr Mogilev players
Hapoel Beit She'an F.C. players
FC Sopron players
FC BATE Borisov players
FC Naftan Novopolotsk players
FC PMC Postavy players
FC Partizan Minsk players
Belarusian football managers
FC Torpedo Minsk managers
FC Gomel managers